Büyük Qaralez (Буюк Къаралез in Cyrillic, detatarized name is Krasny Mak) is a selo in Bakhchysarai Raion of the Autonomous Republic of Crimea, a disputed territory recognized by a majority of countries as part of Ukraine and incorporated by Russia as the Republic of Crimea. It is located in the Crimean Mountains, southerly of Bakhchysarai. The village stretches along the Bystryanka creek, a tributary of the river Belbek. Population: 

Near the village are the medieval hillforts of Mangup and Eski-Kermen. During the Soviet period, the area became a local center, where blocks of flats have been constructed.

References

Villages in Crimea
Bakhchysarai Raion